XHECM-FM (branded as Bonita) is a Mexican Spanish-language FM radio station in Ciudad Mante, Tamaulipas.

History
XECM-AM 1450 received its concession on November 9, 1951. The station was owned by Ricardo López Méndez and broadcast with 1,000 watts day and 250 night. It migrated to FM in 2012 after being approved to do so in December 2011.

References

External links
 ort.com.mx
 
 

Radio stations established in 1951
Radio stations in Ciudad Mante
1951 establishments in Mexico